Kozelschyna is an urban-type settlement in Poltava Oblast (province) of central Ukraine, located 77 km from Poltava. It formerly served as the administrative center of Kozelshchyna Raion, but is now administrated within Kremenchuk Raion. Population:  Kozelschyna is also a railway station, and located close to the highway M22-E584.

History 
Kozelschyna was founded in the early 18th century. In 1718, the Poltava colonel I. Chernyak sent in the Kobelyatsky region hundreds of Poltava regiment Kozaks, who then founded the settlements now belonging to the district. In 1764 attributed to Kobelyatsky company Dnieper pikinerskoho Regiment Catherine province Novorossiysk province, from 1775 to 1783 - to Novosanzharsoho County the same province, later - Oleksopolskoho, then - Poltava District Katerinoslavsky province, from 1796 - to the Little Russian province.

With the formation, in 1802, of Poltava Governorate, Kozelschyna was attached to that latter in 1803, first in the newly Kobelyatsky County. The railway was completed in 1870, with some impact on the rural development. The Soviet power established itself in January 1918. On March 7, 1923, the Bryhadyrivskoho district was attributed to Kozelschyna, from the Kremenchutskyi district. It has then long been the district seat. From February 1932 to September 1937, Kozelschyna was part of the Kharkiv region (on 26 April 1933, the Bryhadyrivskyy district was renamed Kozelshchina). From September 1937, Kozelschyna has ever since been in the Poltava region. On 25 October 1938, Kozelschyna was founded as an urban village.

Attractions 

Among the attractions in Kozelschyna, the cathedral and monastery of the Nativity of the Virgin, built in 1882 by VI and SM Kapnist, as a thankful gift for the recovery of their daughter Mary from serious illness. 1900-1906 K, the brick church has become the Kozelshchina monastery. In 1929, the monastery was closed and the cathedral was turned into a theater, in cells located bio-engineering school, hospital etc. Renewed activity in 1942 - 1949, R., returned to the Orthodox community in 1990 year.

References

External links
  Strolling a day in Kozelshchyna

Urban-type settlements in Kremenchuk Raion